The Eurocard Open was an annual tennis tournament for male professional players. The event was held annually in Stuttgart, Germany, and was played on indoor carpet from 1988 to 1997. Before 1990, during years 1988–1989 the tournament was organized as an invitational round-robin exhibition for 8 players. From 1990 to 1995, the Eurocard Open was an ATP Championship Series tournament, and was held every February on the ATP Tour.

Starting in October 1995, the Eurocard Open was upgraded to ATP Super 9 status. In 1995–1996, the ATP calendar underwent some interesting tournament swaps among indoor events, when the tournament was held on carpet courts. In October 1995, the Stockholm Super 9 event was downgraded to ATP World Series status and moved to November, getting replaced in its old Super 9 slot by the Eurocard Open in Essen. The Antwerp event was dropped from the calendar in 1995 to make room for Stockholm's new slot in November. In 1996, the Eurocard Open retained its Super 9 status but moved from Essen and back to Stuttgart, while Antwerp was again returned to the calendar to replace the Eurocard Open's old slot in February.

In 1998, the Eurocard Open changed surface from indoor carpet to indoor hardcourt. After the last Eurocard Open was held in 2001, the tournament was discontinued, and the eighth ATP Masters Series event of the calendar year was moved to Madrid in 2002.

Past results
Key

Singles

Doubles

Exhibition

External links
 ATP Masters 1000 Stuttgart

 

 
Grand Prix tennis circuit
Indoor tennis tournaments
Tennis tournaments in Germany
Exhibition tennis tournaments
Carpet court tennis tournaments
Hard court tennis tournaments